Tanyochraethes is a genus of beetles in the family Cerambycidae, containing the following species:

 Tanyochraethes anthophilus (Chevrolat, 1860)
 Tanyochraethes cinereolus (Bates, 1892)
 Tanyochraethes clathratus (Chevrolat, 1860)
 Tanyochraethes hololeucus (Bates, 1892)
 Tanyochraethes minca Galileo & Martins, 2007
 Tanyochraethes ochrozona (Bates, 1885)
 Tanyochraethes smithi Chemsak & Linsley, 1965
 Tanyochraethes tildeni Chemsak & Linsley, 1965
 Tanyochraethes truquii (Chevrolat, 1860)

References

Clytini